Chili's Blues (lit. "It Was the 12th of December and Chili Had the Blues") is a Canadian romantic drama film, directed by Charles Binamé and released in 1994. Set in 1963 and taking place in a train station in Montreal where passengers are temporarily stranded due to a snowstorm, the film centres on the interactions between Pierre-Paul (Roy Dupuis), a salesman, and Chili (Lucie Laurier), a depressed college student who is considering suicide, as they meet and fall in love while waiting for train services to resume.

The cast also includes Joëlle Morin, Julie Deslauriers, Emmanuel Bilodeau, Pierre Curzi, Normand Chouinard and Élise Guilbault.

The film premiered on August 26, 1994 at the Montreal World Film Festival.

References

External links

1994 films
1994 drama films
Canadian romantic drama films
Films directed by Charles Binamé
Films set in Montreal
Films shot in Montreal
French-language Canadian films
1990s Canadian films